Nightlife is the fourth studio album by Irish rock band Thin Lizzy, released on 8 November 1974 by Vertigo Records. It was produced by Ron Nevison and bandleader Phil Lynott, and was the first album to feature the band as a quartet with newcomers Scott Gorham and Brian Robertson on guitars.

Some reissue CDs, and occasionally other sources, spell the album title as Night Life, the same as the song title. However the original album title is Nightlife.

The song "Philomena" was written for Lynott's mother.

Album artwork
The album cover, designed by Jim Fitzpatrick, shows a panther-like creature in a city scene. The panther is often thought to be intended to represent Lynott, but Fitzpatrick has confirmed that the panther referred to the Black Panthers and African-American political figures like Malcolm X and Martin Luther King Jr.

Reception

Stephen Thomas Erlewine of AllMusic described Nightlife as an "underrated gem of a record", but a "complete anomaly within their catalog"... "a subdued, soulful record, smooth in ways that Thin Lizzy never were before and rarely were afterwards". He singles out "She Knows" as "gently propulsive, [and] utterly addictive", but adds that there are "still moments of tough, primal rock 'n' roll", such as "It's Only Money" and "Sha La La". Martin Popoff judged the album "more enigmatic, sincere and philosophically complex than much else rock 'n' roll out there at the time", but also "too distant from the band's heart and soul" and overtly into black music, with Lynott "searching for ways to pay homage to his racial heritage."

Cover versions
 American metal band Slough Feg covered "Sha La La" on a 2006 split with Bible of the Devil, and again on their 2011 live album Made in Poland. 
 Concrete Blonde covered "It's Only Money" on their 1989 album Free.
"It's Only Money" was re-recorded 35 years later by Robertson on his 2011 solo album Diamonds and Dirt. 
 The Obsessed covered "It's Only Money" on their 2017 album Sacred.
John Norum covered "It's Only Money" on his 2010 album Play Yard Blues.
Sade covered “Still In Love with You” as a new track on her 2011 collection The Ultimate Collection.

Track listings

The song "Night Life" borrows the title and chorus of Willie Nelson's 1960 song "Night Life", but Nelson is not credited on the album.

On the cassette version, the positions of "She Knows" and "Showdown" were reversed.

Remastered edition
A remastered 2-CD set deluxe edition of Nightlife was released on 12 March 2012.

Singles
 Philomena/Sha-La-La – 7" (1974)
 It’s Only Money/Night Life – 7" (1974)
 Showdown/Night Life – 7" (1974)

Personnel
Thin Lizzy
Phil Lynott – bass guitar, vocals, acoustic guitar, producer
Scott Gorham – guitars
Brian Robertson – guitars, backing vocals
Brian Downey – drums, percussion

Additional musicians
Frankie Miller – joint lead vocals on "Still in Love with You"
Gary Moore – lead guitar on "Still in Love with You"
Jean Alain Roussel – Hammond B3, piano on tracks 1, 4, 5 and 10
Jimmy Horowitz – orchestral arrangements on tracks 1, 5 and 10

Production
Ron Nevison – producer, engineer, mixing
Ted Sharp – engineer
Arnie Acosta – mastering at The Mastering Lab, Los Angeles

References

Thin Lizzy albums
1974 albums
Albums produced by Ron Nevison
Vertigo Records albums
Mercury Records albums
Albums recorded at Trident Studios
Albums recorded at Olympic Sound Studios